The Gull River is a river in Thunder Bay District in Northwestern Ontario, Canada. The river is in the Great Lakes Basin and is a tributary of Lake Nipigon. The river's name is translated from the Ojibwa name, gayaashk.

Course
The river flows from an unnamed lake to Gull Bay on the western side of Lake Nipigon. The river passes through Gull River 55 Indian reserve of the Gull Bay First Nation, located on the south shore of Lake Nipigon.

History
Near the end of the 18th century, the Hudson's Bay Company established a fur trading post, Nipigon House, at Gull Bay.

See also
List of rivers of Ontario

References

Sources

Rivers of Thunder Bay District